The Klaxons were a Belgian accordion-based band founded by Burt Blanca who had a minor UK hit in 1983 with "Clap Clap Sound", which reached number 45 in the UK charts, number 18 on the New Zealand Singles Chart and number 1 on the South African Springbok Singles Charts. The track is considered to be a holiday favourite, and is often accompanied by a dance routine, involving clapping.

They have released two albums: 1984's Clap Clap Sound, and 1995's Woogie Boogie.

Discography

Studio albums

Singles

References

External links
 
 The Klaxons discography at Rate Your Music

Belgian accordionists